John Hinch may refer to:

John Hinch (mathematician) (born 1947), British mathematician
John Hinch (musician) (1947–2021), British drummer